The Oz books form a book series that begins with The Wonderful Wizard of Oz (1900) and relates the fictional history of the Land of Oz. Oz was created by author L. Frank Baum, who went on to write fourteen full-length Oz books. All of Baum's books are in the public domain in the United States. Even while he was alive, Baum was styled as "the Royal Historian of Oz" in order to emphasize the concept that Oz is an actual place on Earth, full of magic. In his Oz books, Baum created the illusion that characters such as Dorothy and Princess Ozma relayed their adventures in Oz to Baum themselves, by means of a wireless telegraph.

Original Oz books by L. Frank Baum

Story compilations and other works by Baum

In addition to the canonical Oz books, several of Baum's works that are not Oz stories are nevertheless nominally set in the same fictional universe as the Oz books, and include several character crossovers. These are: 
Queen Zixi of Ix, The Magical Monarch of Mo, The Sea Fairies, Sky Island, The Life and Adventures of Santa Claus, and John Dough and the Cherub.

Plays by Baum
Baum also wrote Oz-related stage plays:  The Wonderful Wizard of Oz (1901) with music by Paul Tietjens and Nathaniel D. Mann, The Wizard of Oz (1902) (music by Tietjens et al.; with jokes by Glen MacDonough), The Woggle-Bug (1905) with music by Frederick Chapin, The Rainbow's Daughter, or The Magnet of Love (February 1909) with music by Manuel Klein, revised in April 1909 as Ozma of Oz, and ultimately produced, with music by Louis F. Gottschalk as The Tik-Tok Man of Oz. Also in 1909, he wrote a play called The Girl from Oz. The manuscript is held in the archives at Syracuse University, but apparently its relation to Oz is little more than nominal (it is also known as The Girl from Tomorrow and was later adapted for radio by Frank Joslyn Baum), as is also the case with the short story, "The Littlest Giant", a rather brutal tale designated in two lines to be in the Gillikin country of Oz. With Gottschalk writing the music, he wrote an unproduced stage version of The Patchwork Girl of Oz in November 1913, that was developed into the film scenario.

Subsequent Oz books by other writers 

The Oz books that were written subsequent to Baum's death can be classified into three categories:

 Authorized continuations of the Oz series. These consist of works authorized by the original publishers Reilly & Lee, and those authorized by Baum's heirs, represented by the Baum Family Trust.  Reilly & Lee had selected Ruth Plumly Thompson to continue the series, followed by three Oz books written by John R. Neill, two by Jack Snow and one each by Rachel Cosgrove Payes and by Eloise Jarvis McGraw & her daughter.  
 Other books that continue on L. Frank Baum's original canon: Other publishers have since printed a plethora of additional Oz books, written by the aforementioned authors as well as many other fans (more below).
 The books that do not follow L. Frank Baum's original canon, but create an alternate Oz: Most notable among such books is Gregory Maguire's Wicked and sequels.

The Oz books of Sherwood Smith, published in 2005 and 2006, are officially recognized as canon by The Baum Trust. The first two books were published professionally, with the third book published through lulu.com in 2014.

Subsequent books by other writers published by Reilly & Lee 

Ruth Plumly Thompson's style was markedly different from Baum's. Her tales harked back to more traditional fairy tales. She often included a small kingdom, with a prince or princess who saves his or her kingdom and regains the throne or saves Oz from invasion. Thompson even respelled Baum's respelling "Nome" as the more traditional "Gnome".

Illustrator John R. Neill's vision of Oz is more manic than Thompson or Baum's. Houses often get up and do battle, and everything can be alive. His entries take Oz's color scheme (blue for Munchkin Country, red for Quadling Country, etc.)  to an extreme, extending it to sky and skin colors.

Jack Snow was a Baum scholar, and even offered to take over the series at age twelve when Baum died. Snow's books lack any characters created by Thompson or Neill, although he did create his own.

The last two Oz books published by Reilly & Lee:

Subsequent books published by the International Wizard of Oz Club

Other books officially recognized as following the Oz canon by L. Frank Baum's Family Trust

Additional books by the earlier writers

Oz books by other writers 
Some are in line with the originals, while others deviate in various ways.

Alternate Oz books 
Below are some books that deal with alternate versions of Oz, which do not follow the Oz canon originally established by L. Frank Baum.

by Baum family members

Other authors

See also 
 List of characters in the Oz books
 Books in the United States

References 

Hearn, Michael Patrick (ed). (2000, 1973) The Annotated Wizard of Oz. W. W. Norton & Co. 
Greene, David L. and Martin, Dick. (1977) The Oz Scrapbook. Random House. 
Trust, Fred (2008)  "Wizard of Oz books Collectors Price Guide."

External links 
 
L. Frank Baum Papers at Syracuse University
 Oz books by L. Frank Baum at Internet Archive; scanned color illustrated first editions
 The Complete Oz Works (Non-Illustrated)
 Oz books by L. Frank Baum at Project Gutenberg
 The Royal Timeline of Oz: Oz books (canonical and other) listed in chronological order
 The wonderful coloring books of Oz 

Book series introduced in 1900
 
Lists of fantasy books
Lists of American books